Zebop! is the 12th studio album by the American rock band Santana. The album had several releases, and various different color cover backgrounds, including pink and red. The album featured "Winning"; both the album and single were one of Santana's last top 40 hits until 1999 with their release of Supernatural.

Track listing

Side one
 "Changes" (Cat Stevens) – 4:27
 "E Papa Ré" (Carlos Santana, Richard Baker, David Margen, Orestes Vilató, Alex Ligertwood) – 4:32
 "Primera Invasión" (Lear, Margen, Alan Pasqua, Santana) – 2:08
 "Searchin'" (Ligertwood, Santana, Chris Solberg) – 3:54
 "Over and Over" (Rick Meyers) – 4:46
 "Winning" (Russ Ballard) – 3:28

Side two
 "Tales of Kilimanjaro" (Pasqua, Armando Peraza, Raul Rekow, Santana) – 3:24
 "The Sensitive Kind" (J.J. Cale) – 3:32
 "American Gypsy" (Ligertwood, Peraza, Santana, D. Margen, G. Lear, O. Vilató, R. Rekow, R. Baker) – 3:39
 "I Love You Much Too Much" (Alexander Olshanetsky, Don Raye, Chaim Tauber)  – 4:43
 "Brightest Star" (Ligertwood, Santana) – 4:49
 "Hannibal" (Ligertwood, Pasqua, Rekow, Santana) – 3:41

Personnel
 Alex Ligertwood – vocals, background vocals
 Carlos Santana – guitar,  percussion, producer, vocals, background vocals
 Chris Solberg – guitar, keyboards, vocals, background vocals
 Alan Pasqua – keyboards, vocals, background vocals
 Richard Baker – keyboards, organ, piano, synthesizer
 David Margen – bass
 Graham Lear – drums
 Armando Peraza – bongos, percussion, vocals
 Raul Rekow – congas, percussion, background vocals
 Orestes Vilató – percussion, timbales, background vocals
Technical
 Bill Graham – producer
 Keith Olsen – engineer, producer
 Fred Catero – associate producer, engineer

Charts

Weekly charts

Year-end charts

Certifications

Music videos
Six videos were shot from this album on video with multiple cameras in a mock concert setting on what was then the A&M Stage at A&M Records, on La Brea Avenue, Los Angeles, California (now owned by the Jim Henson Company). They were directed by Bruce Gowers and produced by Paul Flattery. The Director of Photography was Jerry Watson. The tracks shot were: 
 "Changes"  
 "E Papa Ré"  
 "Searchin'"  
 "Over and Over" 
 "Winning" (Russ Ballard) – 3:28 
 "I Love You Much Too Much"

References

Santana (band) albums
1981 albums
Albums produced by Carlos Santana
Albums produced by Keith Olsen
Columbia Records albums